Electric bass can mean:

Electric upright bass, the electric version of a double bass
Electric bass guitar
Bass synthesizer
Big Mouth Billy Bass, a battery-powered singing fish